The Berkeley Islands (formerly Berkeley Group are an uninhabited island group in the Qikiqtaaluk Region of northern Canada's territory of Nunavut. 
They are located at the head of Young Inlet off northern Bathurst Island. The Berkeley Group is part of the Arctic Archipelago and is a member of the Parry Islands subgroup. It is composed of the Hosken Islands, Allard Island, Harwood Island, Ricards Island, Seymour Island, and Sherard Osborn Island (the largest). It is named in honor of Maurice Berkeley, 1st Baron FitzHardinge, Royal Navy First Sea Lord.

References

External links
 Berkeley Islands in the Atlas of Canada - Toporama; Natural Resources Canada

Queen Elizabeth Islands
Archipelagoes of the Canadian Arctic Archipelago
Uninhabited islands of Qikiqtaaluk Region